Union Block is a historic commercial building located in the village of Nunda in Livingston County, New York. It is a two-story, 77 by 105 foot, brick and stone structure built in 1882-1883 and designed to draw commerce and investment back to Nunda after a period of economic stagnation.  It is in the Eastlake and Queen Anne style 

It was listed on the National Register of Historic Places in 2000.

References

Commercial buildings on the National Register of Historic Places in New York (state)
Queen Anne architecture in New York (state)
Commercial buildings completed in 1883
Buildings and structures in Livingston County, New York
National Register of Historic Places in Livingston County, New York